Royal Gigolos were a German tech house group, formed in late 2003 by DJ/producers Michael Schmidt (Mike Moore) and Michael Nehrig (Kosmonova) with vocalists  Melanie Stahlkopf and Kristian Romeo, and later in 2008 with Layla and Thorsten Kaiser (DJ Thoka). The group sampled and covered songs from the 1960s and 1980s, several of which were successful across Europe. The group dissolved in 2008.

Discography

Studio albums

Singles

Remixes
 2004: DJ Thoka vs. DJ Taylor - "Happy Song"
 2004: Dave Armstrong - "Make Your Move"
 2004: Bomfunk MC's - "No Way in Hell"
 2005: Laura Branigan - "Self Control 2005"
 2005: Potatoheadz - "Narcotic"
 2005: Mike MH-4 - "Electrica Salsa"
 2005: DJ Tyson vs. Village People - "YMCA 2005"
 2006: Kelly Llorenna - "Tell It to My Heart"
 2006: Nimbus - "Ritmo De La Noche"
 2006: Lazard - "Your Heart Keeps Burning"
 2007: "Why Did You Do It (The Comfort Zone)" (samples Gigi d'Agostino)
 2007: Pink - "Get the Party Started"
 2007: "Girls Just Wanna Dance" (samples Cyndi Lauper's "Girls Just Want to Have Fun", cover of Whitney Houston's "I Wanna Dance with Somebody")
 2008: Hightower - "Tonight"
 2008: Urszula Dudziak - "Papaya"
 2008: Shana Vanguarde - "Gimme! Gimme! Gimme! (A Man After Midnight)" (Royal Gigolos Club Mix)

References

External links 
 Official website
 Discogs

German electronic music groups
Musical groups established in 2003
Musical groups disestablished in 2010
Ultra Records artists